Aquisalimonas halophila is a Gram-negative, moderately halophilic and strictly aerobic bacterium from the genus of Aquisalimonas which has been isolated from soil from a hypersaline mine from Yunnan in China.

References 

Chromatiales
Bacteria described in 2014
Halophiles